Ainslie Kemp (born 18 March 1997) is an Australian rules footballer who playing for the Hawthorn Football Club in the AFL Women's (AFLW) competition. Kemp previously played with the Melbourne Football Club.

AFLW career
Kemp was drafted by Melbourne with their eleventh selection and eighty-eighth overall in the 2016 AFL Women's draft. After initially being named as an emergency, she made her debut in the six point win against  at Casey Fields in round four of the 2017 season. She played every match after her debut to finish with four games. Melbourne signed Kemp for the 2018 season during the trade period in May 2017. In August 2020, Kemp was delisted by Melbourne. In June 2022, Kemp joined expansion club Hawthorn.

Statistics 
Updated to the end of S7 (2022).

|-
| 2017 ||  || 36
| 4 || 0 || 2 || 21 || 9 || 30 || 8 || 8 || 0.0 || 0.5 || 5.3 || 2.3 || 7.3 || 2.0 || 2.0 || 0
|-
| 2018 ||  || 36
| 0 || — || — || — || — || — || — || — || — || — || — || — || — || — || — || 0
|-
| 2019 ||  || 36
| 4 || 0 || 0 || 10 || 12 || 22 || 5 || 5 || 0.0 || 0.0 || 2.5 || 3.0 || 5.5 || 1.3 || 1.3 || 0
|-
| 2020 ||  || 36
| 2 || 0 || 0 || 8 || 6 || 14 || 0 || 3 || 0.0 || 0.0 || 4.0 || 3.0 || 7.0 || 0.0 || 1.5 || 0
|-
| S7 (2022) ||  || 16
| 7 || 0 || 0 || 48 || 9 || 57 || 12 || 8 || 0.0 || 0.0 || 6.9 || 1.3 || 8.1 || 1.7 || 1.1 || 0
|- class="sortbottom"
! colspan=3| Career
! 17 !! 0 !! 2 !! 87 !! 36 !! 123 !! 25 !! 24 !! 0.0 !! 0.1 !! 5.1 !! 2.1 !! 7.2 !! 1.5 !! 1.4 !! 0
|}

Honours and achievements 
Individual
  mark of the year: S7 (2022)

References

External links 

1997 births
Living people
Melbourne Football Club (AFLW) players
Hawthorn Football Club (AFLW) players
Australian rules footballers from Victoria (Australia)
Victorian Women's Football League players